The THSR 700T  is the high-speed electric multiple unit trainset derived from the Japanese Shinkansen family for Taiwan High Speed Rail (THSR), Taiwan's high-speed rail line. The THSR 700T is based primarily on the 700 Series Shinkansen, with the "T" referring to Taiwan. The trains were manufactured in Japan by Kawasaki Heavy Industries, Nippon Sharyo, and Hitachi, Ltd., marking the first time Japanese Shinkansen trains have been exported overseas. 30 trains were delivered to THSR operator Taiwan High Speed Rail Corporation (THSRC), and are in regular service with a top speed of  since the line's opening on January 5, 2007.

History 
Taiwan's Bureau of High Speed Rail (BOHSR) started to tender THSR as a build-operate-transfer (BOT) scheme in October 1996.  The two competitors were the Taiwan High Speed Rail Consortium (THSRC) and the Chunghwa High Speed Rail Consortium (CHSRC). THSRC's bid was based on the high-speed technology platform of Eurotrain, a joint venture of GEC-Alsthom, the main maker of the French TGV, and Siemens, the main maker of the German ICE. CHSRC's bid was based on Japanese Shinkansen technology supplied by Taiwan Shinkansen Consortium (TSC), a joint venture of Japanese companies.  THSRC was named preferred bidder in September 1997, then, after being reconstituted as the Taiwan High Speed Rail Corporation (THSRC), it signed the BOT agreement with BOHSR on July 23, 1998.  Following an offer from the Japanese government to provide cheap loans to THSRC if it switches to Shinkansen technology, in spite of an earlier agreement with Eurotrain, THSRC decided to re-tender the core systems technology contract June 1999.  THSRC announced on December 28, 1999, that it would negotiate a final contract with TSC. The contract, which included the supply of rolling stock, was signed on December 12, 2000.  The controversial awarding was challenged by Eurotrain in courts without success, a further lawsuit for damage payments was successful however.

While TSC's original offer in CHSRC's 1997 bid for the BOT franchise was based on the 500 Series Shinkansen, its bid for THSRC's 1999 tender was based on the newer 700 Series Shinkansen.  THSRC maintained its European specifications, thus, the trains had had to be designed for and commissioned according to European specifications, too.

On January 30, 2004, a roll-out ceremony was conducted at Kawasaki Heavy Industries' Hyogo Works. The first train was shipped to Taiwan in May 2004. Running tests started on the THSR high speed line on January 27, 2005, after four months of delays, on the Tainan–Kaohsiung section. All 30 trains have been delivered to Taiwan by 2006.

In November 2008, THSRC announced that the company considers ordering an additional six to twelve trains from the Japanese makers for service starting in 2011, in order to cope with increased demand that was expected by that time. In May 2012 an order was placed with Kawasaki Heavy Industries (structural and mechanical parts) and Toshiba (electrical and electromechanical parts) for four 12 car trains, at an estimated cost of 19 billion Japanese yen, the trains were delivered between December 2012 and 2015 with options for extra sets.

Technical details 
The THSR 700T series is based on the 700 Series Shinkansen operated by JR Central and JR West on the Tōkaidō Shinkansen and San'yō Shinkansen in Japan.  However, more powerful motors and eddy current brakes on trailers provide for the higher top speed.  Also for  operation, a number of features were derived from the 500 Series Shinkansen, such as the bogies, or the T-shaped and aerodynamically optimised pantographs for reduced noise emission atop cars 4 and 9.  The D-ATC (Digital Automatic Train Control) system was in turn derived from that of the 800 Series Shinkansen.  Like the 700 Series Shinkansen, a 700T trainset is made of 4-car sub-sets, each with three motor cars and one trailer, albeit a full train is a 12-car set, rather than a 16-car, or 8-car set.

Due to the European safety requirements adapted by THSRC, the trains were equipped with a number of additional safety features compared to Shinkansen trains in Japan.  The ATC system was augmented with cruise control and station stopping control and was also made suitable for bi-directional operation, and there is a driver vigilance device.  Bogies were fitted with an instability detection system, and pantographs with a system that automatically lowers the rear pantograph if it detects a failure of the leading pantograph.  The trains were built with shock absorbing elements for protection in low-speed collisions and were equipped with a parking brake.  For enhanced fire safety, fireproof and smokeproof materials were selected for the interior, which was configured with fire barriers, and the trains were equipped with fire and smoke detectors and a battery supplied emergency ventilation system.  Passenger doors can be operated from any car, not just from the driver's cab, and are equipped with an obstacle detection system that can abort the closing of the door.  In addition, the train is equipped with emergency escape windows, which can be broken with hammers for use as emergency exits. The pantograph can be operated by remote control.

Additional changes were made to the HVAC systems to account for Taiwan's warmer climates, such as higher strength and wear specifications of certain components, and a more powerful air conditioning system. As with other Shinkansen types, both end cars are trailers and braking power is reduced on the end cars, to avoid slip on powered bogies.

THSR tunnels were built according to European specifications, with diameters larger than those in Japan. The shorter nose, and the lack of a sliding window and an extra door for the driver provided for more space for passengers.

All cars feature single passenger rooms with 2+3 or 2+2 seating, as on the 700 Series Shinkansen.  Toilets were installed on odd numbered cars.  One end of car 7 features four wheelchair accessible seats, also provide for the fastening of wheelchairs, and there are two foldable wheelchairs.  The toilet next to the handicapped area was built to be accessible by wheelchair, with automatic sliding doors, wider space to allow a wheelchair to turn around, and handrails.  The train has no restaurant or bar, but was equipped with vending machines, while Business Car passengers also get seat service.  Certain cars were equipped with on-board telephones, in anticipation of the construction of a base system.

The per capita energy consumption of a fully loaded 700T train is 16% of private cars and half of buses, carbon dioxide emissions are 11% and a fourth, respectively.

Operation 

As of April 2010, the THSR 700T trains ran without a serious accident. During the 2010 Kaohsiung earthquake on March 4, 2010, the wheels of one bogie of a train came off the rails during emergency braking, but there were no injuries and the train arrived at the next station after one hour of repairs.

In November 2010, following complaints when waiting lines formed at the toilets, THSRC changed the gender assignment of the toilets in the 700T trains.  In the original configuration, in each car with toilets, there was a men's toilet with urinal and two unisex toilets; one of the latter was reassigned as women's toilet.

Train simulator 

A THSR 700T train simulator, known as Railfan: Taiwan High Speed Rail, was developed jointly by Taiwan-based company Actainment and Japanese company Ongakukan in 2007, based on the latter's Train Simulator series.  The software was released on the PlayStation 3 system in Asia (Hong Kong, Taiwan, & Singapore) on July 12, 2007, and in Japan on November 1, 2007.

See also 
 List of high speed trains

References

External links 

Official Taiwan High Speed Rail 

Shinkansen train series
High-speed trains of Taiwan
Hitachi multiple units
25 kV AC multiple units
Train-related introductions in 2007
Passenger trains running at least at 300 km/h in commercial operations
Nippon Sharyo multiple units
Kawasaki multiple units